Michael Bruce may refer to:

 Michael Bruce (musician) (born 1948), American rock musician
 Michael Bruce (composer) (born 1983), Scottish composer and lyricist working in theatre, television and film
 Michael Bruce (entrepreneur) (born 1973), CEO of Purplebricks
 Michael Bruce (poet) (1746–1767), Scottish poet and hymnist
 Michael Bruce (MP) (1787–1861), British adventurer 
 Michael Ian Bruce (born 1938), Australian chemist

   Sir Michael Bruce,  6th Baronet   (died 1795), of the Bruce baronets
   Sir Michael Bruce,  7th Baronet   (died 1827), of the Bruce baronets
   Sir Michael Bruce,  8th Baronet   (1797–1862), of the Bruce baronets
 Sir Michael Bruce, 11th Baronet (1894–1957), author and adventurer
 Michael Bruce (minister, born 1635) (1635–1693), Scottish Presbyterian minister
 Michael Bruce (minister, born 1686) (1686–1735), Irish Presbyterian minister

See also
 Michael Brudenell-Bruce, 8th Marquess of Ailesbury (born 1926)